Luxury liner may refer to:
Ocean liner
Luxury Liner (album), a 1977 album by Emmylou Harris
Luxury Liner (1933 film), a 1933 Paramount Pictures film
Luxury Liner (1948 film), 1948 motion picture from MGM
"Luxury Liner", a 1967 song by International Submarine Band